Fasa County is in Fars province, Iran. The capital of the county is the city of Fasa. At the 2006 census, the county's population was 188,189 in 45,333 households. The following census in 2011 counted 203,129 people in 55,749 households. At the 2016 census, the county's population was 205,187 in 61,509 households.

Administrative divisions

The population history and structural changes of Fasa County's administrative divisions over three consecutive censuses are shown in the following table. The latest census shows four districts, eight rural districts, and six cities.

References

 

Counties of Fars Province